Who Do You Trust? (originally titled Do You Trust Your Wife? until July 1958) is an American television game show. The show aired from September 30, 1957 to November 15, 1957, at 4:30 pm Eastern  on ABC, and from November 18, 1957 to December 27, 1963 at 3:30 pm Eastern. This schedule helped garner a significant number of young viewers coming home from school. (The revised title also outraged English teachers, who preferred "Whom Do You Trust?")

The series was initially emceed by Johnny Carson and announced by Bill Nimmo. A year into the run, Nimmo was replaced by Ed McMahon, and from that point until 1992 Carson and McMahon would spend the majority of their careers together. The pair departed in 1962 when Carson was hired to take over from Jack Paar on NBC's Tonight, which had been retitled The Jack Paar Show (and changed back to an earlier title, The Tonight Show, under Carson), where the two would spend the next thirty years together. Woody Woodbury took over the Who Do You Trust? hosting position while Nimmo returned to announce. The show was produced at the Little Theater on 44th Street in New York (today known as the Helen Hayes Theater).

Gameplay

Three couples competed on each show, nearly always a man and a woman chosen for their unique backgrounds; the announcer would introduce couples one at a time, and Carson spent more time interviewing the contestants than quizzing them.

In the quiz portion, Carson would tell the male contestant the category of the upcoming question; the man would then have to decide whether to answer the question himself or "trust" the woman to do so.

Three questions were played per couple, worth $25, $50, and $75; if two or all three couples tied in the cash winnings, they were asked a question involving a numerical answer; the couple coming closest to the correct answer moved on to the bonus game.

Bonus round
From 1957 until the quiz-show scandals in 1959, the bonus round pitted the day's winners against the winners from the previous day. One partner from each team, usually the man, was placed in an isolation booth and asked a question with several answers. The one who got the most correct answers won $500 and the right to return the following day.

After the scandals, in which Who Do You Trust? was not involved, the bonus round involved the winning couple attempting to unscramble a name or phrase in fifteen seconds.

Broadcast history

Who Do You Trust? began as a CBS prime time game titled Do You Trust Your Wife?, emceed by ventriloquist Edgar Bergen, which ran from January 3, 1956, to March 26, 1957.  On the original show all the contestants were married couples chosen for their unique backgrounds.

After a brief chat with Bergen (and his dummies "Charlie McCarthy", "Mortimer Snerd" and "Effie Klinker") the couples would try to answer four questions. The first was a match question, where the spouses tried to match each other's answer to a question about their married life. The remaining questions were of general knowledge, where after the category was revealed, the husband chose whether to answer himself or "trust" his wife to do so, hence the name of the show. The first correct answer won $100, the second added $200, and the third $300. For the fourth question they could wager any of their winnings by answering a question from one of six categories ranging in value and difficulty from $100 to $600. If the couple won no money, they would answer a very easy $100 question. The couple with the most money competed with the winners from the previous week's show to name as many items as possible in a category with the couple coming up with the most answers receiving $100 a week for a year. Couples could return to the show until defeated; one couple, Erik and Helena Gude, remained on the show long enough to amass $120,800.

In 1957, Carson's career was in serious trouble due to the cancellation of his prime time CBS variety series The Johnny Carson Show when he became a daytime game show host. The series immediately launched him into the public consciousness. When it returned as a daytime show on ABC on September 30, it kept the Do You Trust Your Wife? title until July 1958, changing its title to expand the scope of contestants beyond married couples.

One major difference between Carson and NBC's You Bet Your Life host Groucho Marx was that Carson often participated in demonstrations of the contestants' interests or hobbies. On one memorable show he tried his hand at driving a miniature race car (and crashed into a wall), while on another he donned scuba gear and dived into a tank of water. Groucho, on the other hand, almost never left his desk, letting his announcer, George Fenneman, take part in the demonstrations.

As was almost always the case in daytime television programs of the era, including soap operas and even children's shows, all of the background music on Who Do You Trust? was supplied by a single organist, which was John Gart for this series.

In March 1962, Carson was asked to take over from Jack Paar on The Tonight Show, but he still had six months remaining on his contract with ABC. When Carson and McMahon left to do The Tonight Show (after the September 7, 1962 show) they were replaced by comedian Woody Woodbury and original announcer Bill Nimmo. The series continued until December 27, 1963.

When ABC picked up Do You Trust Your Wife?, it created a scheduling conflict with the popular American Bandstand, hosted by Dick Clark, in the afternoon lineup. At the time American Bandstand (which had just premiered) aired for ninety minutes from 3 PM to 4:30 PM daily and was popular enough that ABC did not want to move it out of its timeslot, so a compromise was reached. Do You Trust Your Wife? was placed in the 3:30 PM timeslot that ABC had originally intended for the show, with the remainder of American Bandstand following it at 4 PM. This lasted until 1961, when ABC reduced American Bandstand by thirty minutes and started it immediately after what was now Who Do You Trust?.  In Philadelphia, ABC affiliate WFIL-TV, which produced Bandstand continued to air the show locally at 3:30.  The station ran Who Do You Trust? on a one-week delay earlier in the afternoon.

International versions
A British version of Do You Trust Your Wife? was produced by ATV in September 1956 and was hosted by Bob Monkhouse (making this his first time hosting a game show) and Denis Goodwin. The show was based on the Edgar Bergen version and featured a top prize of £2 per week for a whole year (for a grand total of £104). The show was cancelled after one series and replaced with a loose remake called Bury Your Hachet (also hosted by Monkhouse and Goodwin), which proved to be even worse and was gone by the end of 1957.

An Australian version aired in Melbourne from 1957 to 1958 on station GTV-9, at a time when Australian television series often aired in just a single city. Based on the Edgar Bergen version, the Melbourne version was hosted by ventriloquist Ron Blaskett and his three dolls.

References

David Schwartz, Steve Ryan, and Fred Wostbrock, The Encyclopedia of TV Game Shows (3rd edition, 1999)
Laurence Leamer, King of the Night (1989)

External links
 
 

American Broadcasting Company original programming
1950s American game shows
1960s American game shows
1957 American television series debuts
1963 American television series endings
English-language television shows
Black-and-white American television shows
Black-and-white Australian television shows
Television series by CBS Studios